Charlotte Madelon is a video game designer based in the Netherlands whose works include Cover Me (2014), Lily (2017), and The Rose Garden (2018).

References

External links 

 

Dutch video game designers
Indie video game developers
Women video game designers
Living people
Year of birth missing (living people)